David James Reid Strang  is a former senior police officer and public servant from Scotland.  He has worked in a number of senior roles in the criminal justice sector, most notably as Chief Constable of Lothian and Borders Police and Her Majesty's Chief Inspector of Prisons for Scotland.

Early life and education

Strang was born in Glasgow and studied at Glasgow Academy and Loretto School. Strang then went on to study engineering science at the University of Durham, graduating with a BSc, before studying for an MSc in organisational behaviour at the University of London.

Police career

Strang began his police career with the Metropolitan Police in 1980. He was posted to a number of different divisions as well as time with Criminal Investigation Department, Territorial Support Group and a secondment to the Police Staff College, Bramshill. After rising to divisional commander of Wembley Division, he left the force in 1998 and was appointed assistant chief constable of Lothian and Borders Police.

In August 2001 Strang was appointed chief constable of Dumfries and Galloway Police. He led a number of initiatives, focusing on alcohol and drug action as well as youth justice and was president of the Association of Chief Police Officers in Scotland during the 2004/05 year. On 29 March 2007 he was appointed chief constable of Lothian and Borders Police and served in that role until the force was amalgamated into Police Scotland.

Work with Prisons

Strang was a member of the Scottish Prisons Commission which published a report entitled Scotland's Choice in 2008. In 2013 he was appointed as Her Majesty's Chief Inspector of Prisons for Scotland in succession to Hugh Munro, a post which he held until 2018. He was subsequently appointed as chair of the Independent Inquiry into Mental Health Services in Tayside.

Drug Deaths Taskforce 
Strang was appointed Chair of the Scottish Government's Drugs Death Taskforce in January 2022, following the resignation of Professor Catriona Matheson in December 2021.

Honours and awards

 He received the Honorary Degree of Doctor of the University (D.Univ) from the University of Stirling on 23 November 2018.

References

External links
 Lothian and Borders Police - David Strang QPM BSc MSc

British Chief Constables
Living people
People educated at the Glasgow Academy
People educated at Loretto School, Musselburgh
British prison inspectors
Scottish recipients of the Queen's Police Medal
Alumni of Hatfield College, Durham
Year of birth missing (living people)
Commanders of the Order of the British Empire
Scottish police officers
Officers in Scottish police forces
Metropolitan Police officers